Hydrazobenzene (1,2-diphenylhydrazine) is an aromatic organic compound consisting of two aniline groups joined via their nitrogen atoms. It is an important industrial chemical used in the manufacture of dyes, pharmaceuticals, and hydrogen peroxide.

References

Hydrazines
Anilines